

England

Head coach: Geoff Cooke

 Paul Ackford
 Rob Andrew
 Mark Bailey
 Steve Bates
 Alan Buzza
 Will Carling (c.)
 Fran Clough
 Wade Dooley
 David Egerton
 Jerry Guscott
 Simon Halliday
 Richard Hill
 Simon Hodgkinson
 Mark Linnett
 Brian Moore
 John Olver
 Jeff Probyn
 Paul Rendall
 Mickey Skinner
 Mike Teague
 Rory Underwood
 Jon Webb
 Peter Winterbottom

France

Head coach: Jacques Fouroux

 Marc Andrieu
 Louis Armary
 Pierre Berbizier (c.)*
 Serge Blanco
 Dominique Bouet
 Didier Camberabero
 Alain Carminati
 Éric Champ
 Denis Charvet
 Jean Condom
 Thierry Devergie
 Dominique Erbani
 Jean-Pierre Garuet-Lempirou
 Fabrice Heyer
 Peyo Hontas
 Bernard Lacombe
 Thierry Lacroix
 Jean-Baptiste Lafond
 Patrice Lagisquet
 Jean-Marc Lhermet
 Thierry Maset
 Éric Melville
 Franck Mesnel
 Pascal Ondarts
 Marc Pujolle
 Laurent Rodriguez (c.)**
 Olivier Roumat
 Henri Sanz
 Éric Sauboua
 Philippe Sella
 Frédéric Velo

(*) Captain in the first two games
(**) Captain in the third and fourth games

Ireland

Head coach: Ciaran Fitzgerald

 Fergus Aherne
 Willie Anderson (c.)*
 Michael Bradley
 Paul Collins
 Keith Crossan
 Phil Danaher
 Des Fitzgerald
 Neil Francis
 Mick Galwey
 Gary Halpin
 Kenneth Hooks
 David Irwin
 Ralph Keyes
 Michael Kiernan
 Donal Lenihan (c.)**
 Noel Mannion
 Phillip Matthews
 Denis McBride
 John MacDonald
 Brendan Mullin
 Kenny Murphy
 Pat Murray
 Pat O'Hara
 James O'Riordan
 Nick Popplewell
 Peter Russell
 Brian Smith
 Steve Smith

(*) Captain in the first two games
(**) Captain in the third and fourth games

Scotland

Head coach: Ian McGeechan

 John Allan
 Gary Armstrong
 Alex Brewster
 Paul Burnell
 Finlay Calder
 Craig Chalmers
 Damian Cronin
 Peter Dods
 Chris Gray
 Gavin Hastings
 Scott Hastings
 John Jeffrey
 Sean Lineen
 Graham Marshall
 Kenny Milne
 Greig Oliver
 Craig Redpath
 Graham Shiel
 David Sole (c.)
 Tony Stanger
 Iwan Tukalo
 Derek Turnbull
 Alan Watt
 Doddie Weir
 Derek White
 Douglas Wyllie

Wales

Head coach: John Ryan/Ron Waldron

 Andy Allen
 Allan Bateman
 Andy Booth
 Chris Bridges
 Tony Clement
 Richie Collins
 Carwyn Davies
 Phil Davies
 Laurance Delaney
 Alan Edmunds
 David Evans
 Steve Ford
 Mike Griffiths
 Mike Hall
 Garin Jenkins
 Arthur Jones
 Gary Jones
 Mark Jones
 Robert Jones (c.)
 Gareth Llewellyn
 Martyn Morris
 Kevin Moseley
 Mark Perego
 Kevin Phillips
 Rowland Phillips
 Jeremy Pugh
 Mark Ring
 Paul Thorburn
 Mark Titley
 Ian Watkins
 Brian Williams
 Hugh Williams-Jones

Six Nations Championship squads